Nocturnes (sometimes styled as NOCTURNES) is the sophomore concept album by British composer Daniel Liam Glyn, released on 18 September 2020 via Caravan Boy Records. Glyn describes the album as 'a collection of electronic, ambient soundscapes influenced by my dreams and inspired by the enigmatic thrill of night-time' and was recorded during the COVID-19 pandemic in 2020. On 14 May 2021, Glyn released a special edition of the album titled Nocturnes (Expanded Universe Edition).  This release included all the original tracks plus 5 exclusive new tracks.

Critical reception 

David Reddish from Queerty described the record as "ominous and optimistic - perfect for dancing or chilling" and cites it as "a perfect soundtrack for moving into Autumn". Nick Randell from SNS Online commented on the shift in style from Glyn's previous work, describing the album as possessing an "urban,  dystopian vibe" with tracks that were "melodic, complex and thought provoking".

Track listing

  signifies an additional producer.

Personnel 
Credits adapted from the liner notes of Nocturnes (Expanded Universe Edition).

 Daniel Liam Glyn – composer, arranger, producer , art direction, graphic design
 Bjorn Thomassen – additional production , mixing , remix 
 Fi Roberts – mixing 
 Rigil – remix 
 Katie Tavini – mastering 
 Heather Matthews – graphic design

Release history

References

External links
 Nocturnes

2020 albums
Daniel Liam Glyn albums
Concept albums